Boise State University was founded in 1932 as Boise Junior College by the Episcopal Church. After two years the school became independent, and in 1940 it moved from St. Margaret's Hall to its present site, along the south bank of the Boise River, between Capitol Boulevard and Broadway Avenue.

In 1965 it gained four-year status as Boise College and began awarding baccalaureate degrees. Four years later, the school joined the Idaho state system of higher education and was renamed Boise State College. In 1974, Boise State gained university status to become Idaho's third university.

 1892 – St. Margaret's School was founded in Christ Chapel (Boise, Idaho), a forerunner to Boise Junior College
 1932 – BSU was founded as Boise Junior College by the Episcopal Church at St. Margaret's Hall
 1933 – first season of football
 1934 – Episcopal Church ends its affiliation and board of directors after assumes leadership.
 1940 – campus is moved to present site on the south bank of the Boise River – formerly the Boise Airport – (photo – 1930s) – (photo – 1940s)
 Administration Building opens, built by WPA – (photo – 1940s)
 College Field (1940–49), the first football stadium, opens at site of present Student Union Building – (photo 1) – (photo 2)
 1942 – old Student Union opens – (photo – 1940s) – (photo – 1950s)
 1947 – after a year as an assistant, Lyle Smith is elevated to head coach of the football team.
 overall record of 156-26-8 (.848) with five undefeated seasons, 16 conference titles, and a national JC championship (1958); – steps down after 1967 season to become athletic director
 1950 – first Bronco Stadium (1950–69), on present site – replaced in 1970
 1951 – completion of first dormitories: Driscoll Hall (men) and Morrison Hall (women)
 1955 – Bronco Gymnasium constructed – (photo)
 1958 – football team wins NJCAA national championship
 1964 – Library opens – (photo)
 1965 – baccalaureate degrees introduced; becomes Boise College
 Alumni Association is formed, enrollment reaches 5,000
 1966 – Liberal Arts Building constructed – (photo 1) – (photo 2) 
 1967 – new Student Union Building constructed – (photo)
 Chaffee Hall dormitories constructed – (photo)
 final football season as a two-year school
 1968 – football team begins competition as a four-year school, competing as an independent in NAIA for two seasons
 new athletic director Lyle Smith hires Tony Knap to replace himself as head football coach
 1969 – state system of higher education assumes control, becomes Boise State College
 final football season in second Bronco Stadium (northwest–southeast alignment) – (photo – late 1960s) (photo – 1968)
 1970 – Construction of multiple buildings: Business, Vocational Education, and Towers dormitories
 BSC joins the Big Sky Conference for men's athletics, moves to NCAA Division II ("College Division" until 1973)
 new Bronco Stadium opens September 11 (now a north–south alignment) – seating capacity of 14,500 and a green AstroTurf field – (photo – 1971)
 1971 – Begins publishing the Western Writers Series, monographs focusing on authors of the American Frontier and American West
 1971 – expansion of Student Union Building (1967); Auxiliary Gymnasium completed
 1972 – four-story addition to Library (1964) completed
 1974 – university status granted, becomes Boise State University
 1975 – Bronco Stadium adds upper deck to east side: 20,000 capacity – (photo)
 1976 – Tony Knap departs for UNLV, UCLA assistant coach Jim Criner is named head football coach for 1976 season
 1978 – Science/Nursing building opens
 Big Sky (& BSU) moves up to newly formed Division I-AA
 1979 – seven-story Education building dedicated in January
 enrollment reaches 10,000
 1980 – construction of BSU Pavilion begins in February, (photo 1981) – displaces tennis courts and baseball field – (photo – 1971) (photo – late 1970s)
 final baseball season played at Borah Field, dropped as a varsity sport in June, due to Title IX
 football field at Bronco Stadium dedicated as "Lyle Smith Field" on November 8.
 football team wins the I-AA national championship on December 20 in Sacramento
 1981 – Lyle Smith retires after 35 years at BSU, last 13 as athletic director.
 1982 – BSU Pavilion (multi-purpose arena) opens in late May – (photo – mid 1980s)
 tennis courts relocated to former baseball infield
 1983 – Jim Criner departs for Iowa State, defensive coordinator Lyle Setencich promoted to head football coach for 1983 season
 1984 – Velma V. Morrison Center for performing arts opens on April 7
 1986 – Blue AstroTurf field installed at Bronco Stadium in summer, the first (and only) of its kind
 football team posts first losing record since 1946
 1987 – Washington assistant coach Skip Hall becomes head football coach, following the resignation (Nov. 1986) of Lyle Setencich
 1990 – football team reaches Division I-AA semifinals
 1991 – President John Keiser fired by state board of education on September 20.
 1992 – first doctoral degree approved: Ed.D. in curriculum and instruction
 enrollment reaches 15,000; the state's largest
 1993 – Pokey Allen from Portland State becomes head football coach, following the resignation (Nov. 1992) of Skip Hall
 1994 – football team wins Big Sky title and reaches the I-AA national championship game
 1995 – final football season in Big Sky Conference and Division I-AA
 1996 – athletic program moves to Big West Conference and NCAA Division I-A.
 wrestling remains in the Pac-10, as an affiliate member.
 Head football coach Pokey Allen dies of cancer in late December
 bachelor's programs established in civil, electrical, and mechanical engineering 
 1997 – Bronco Stadium expansion in south corners increases seating capacity to 30,000
 Houston Nutt from Murray State becomes head football coach
 College of Engineering is formally established 
 1998 – Houston Nutt departs for Arkansas, Oregon assistant coach Dirk Koetter becomes head football coach for 1998 season
 1999 – football team wins its first Big West title and the Humanitarian Bowl against Louisville
 2000 – football team wins second Big West title and Humanitarian Bowl against UTEP
 2001 – athletics moves to the Western Athletic Conference (WAC), wrestling remains in the Pac-10, as affiliate member
 Dirk Koetter departs for Arizona State, assistant Dan Hawkins promoted to head football coach for 2001 season
 2002 – football team wins first WAC title and Humanitarian Bowl against Iowa State
 2003 – football team wins second WAC title and Fort Worth Bowl over host TCU
 2004 – enrollment reaches 18,456
 BSU Pavilion renamed Taco Bell Arena in June ($4 million for 15 years)
 football team goes undefeated in regular season for the first time as a four-year school, wins its third straight WAC title and finishes 9th in the BCS rankings, but lost the Liberty Bowl in Memphis to Louisville in a match-up of the two best BCS non-AQ conference teams that year.
 2005 – football team wins fourth straight WAC title, but loses MPC Computers Bowl at home to Boston College.
 2006 – BSU wins the WAC Commissioner's Cup for the 2005–06 academic year.
 Dan Hawkins departs for Colorado, assistant Chris Petersen promoted to head football coach for 2006 season
 senior Ben Cherrington (157 lb.) wins NCAA national championship in wrestling; Cherrington and Tyler Sherfeyare named the 2006 Pac-10 Conference Wrestler of the Year and Newcomer of the Year, respectively.
 football team is undefeated for the second time in three years, wins fifth straight WAC titleand earns first BCS berth in the Fiesta Bowl against Oklahoma in January 2007.
 2007 – football team wins the Fiesta Bowl in January in a thrilling overtime finish. BSU finished the 2006 season as the only undefeated team in the nation (after Ohio State lost to Florida in the national championship game), and placed #5 in the final AP poll, with one first place vote, BSU's highest ranking ever.
 State of Idaho approves funding for a $35.9 million addition to Bronco Stadium. Expansion replaces the original press box (1970), adds luxury suites, club seats, and loge boxes in time for the 2008 season. The new capacity is 32,000.
 BSU sells the film rights of the 2006 season to Michael Hoffman and Iron Circle Pictures, who will produce a documentary and later a feature film based on the story of the football program.
 2006 football team wins two ESPY Awards in the categories of "Best Game" (2007 Fiesta Bowl) and "Best Play" (Game-winning Statue of Liberty play).
 Fiesta Bowl MVP Jared Zabransky appears as the cover athlete of the popular EA Sports video game NCAA Football 08.
 junior Luke Shields is one of four male tennis players representing the U.S. at the 2007 Pan American Games in Rio de Janeiro.
 Boise State celebrates its 75th anniversary and announces "Destination Distinction," a campaign to raise $175 million.
 2008 – Broncos join the "10-20-20" club (10 football wins, 20 men's basketball wins, 20 women's basketball wins) for the 2007–08 season, only the 20th school since 1980 to achieve the feat.
 BSU announces NASA Teacher in Space Barbara Morgan will start her full-time position as a Distinguished Educator in Residence
 football team regained the WAC title and met TCU in the Poinsettia Bowl in San Diego, but lost 16–17.
 2009 – undefeated football team retained the WAC title and again played TCU in the postseason, in the Fiesta Bowl, and BSU won 17–10.
 2010 – announced the hiring of Leon Rice as head basketball coach on March 26. Rice spent 11 years as an assistant at Gonzaga in Spokane; he replaced Greg Graham, relieved of his duties earlier in the month.

References

External links
 Official website
 Historic Boise State Digital Collection features photographs that reflect the history of Boise State, from its beginning as Boise Junior College in 1932 to the present. Includes images of campus life, student activities, buildings, and athletics

Boise State University